"Lay Your Love on Me" is a pop song by the British pop group Racey; it was their second single release. The song was written by Nicky Chinn and Mike Chapman, produced by Mickie Most and released in 1978 on the RAK Records label. It was their first hit single, reaching No.3 in the UK Singles Chart, and No.2 in Ireland in December 1978. It was a No.1 hit in the Netherlands, Australia and New Zealand later that same year.

Kikki Danielsson covered the song on her 1979 album, Rock'n Yodel.

Charts

Weekly charts

Year-end charts

Certifications

References

1978 songs
1978 singles
Racey songs
Kikki Danielsson songs
Number-one singles in Australia
Songs written by Mike Chapman
Songs written by Nicky Chinn
Song recordings produced by Mickie Most
RAK Records singles
Dutch Top 40 number-one singles
Number-one singles in New Zealand